Sleuth is a 2007 thriller film directed by Kenneth Branagh and starring Jude Law and Michael Caine. The screenplay by Harold Pinter is an adaptation of Anthony Shaffer's play, Sleuth. Caine had previously starred in a 1972 version, where he played Law's role against Laurence Olivier.

Plot

Two extremely clever British men are in a game of trickery and deceit. Andrew Wyke, an aging famous author who lives alone in a high-tech mansion, after his wife Maggie has left him for a younger man; and Milo Tindle, an aspiring actor, equipped with charm and wit, who demonstrates both qualities once again. When Wyke invites Tindle to his mansion, Tindle seeks to convince the former into letting his wife go by signing the divorce paper. However, Wyke seems far more interested in playing mind games with his wife's new lover, and lures him into a series of actions he thoroughly planned in seeking revenge on his unfaithful spouse.

Cast
 Michael Caine as Andrew Wyke
 Jude Law as Milo Tindle

The film's screenwriter, Harold Pinter, credited as "Man on TV", is seen on a television in the background interviewing another man, played by an uncredited Kenneth Branagh. The only other person seen in the film is an uncredited actress, Carmel O'Sullivan, in the role of Maggie.

Production
Caine had starred as hairdresser Milo Tindle opposite Laurence Olivier's novelist Andrew Wyke in the 1972 film Sleuth, with each being nominated for an Academy Award for their performance. In the 2007 film, Caine took the role of Wyke, and Law took Caine's role of Tindle.

This was the second time Law performed a film character originated by Caine, the first having been the title role of Alfie. Caine himself had previously starred in two different roles for two versions of Get Carter.

According to many accounts, this set out to be a remake of the 1972 version, but Pinter's screenplay-offered "a fresh take" on Shaffer's play and "a very different form" from the original film.

In his review of the film's debut at the 2007 Venice Film Festival, Roderick Conway Morris observed: "The reworking of the play is not just an adept transformation of theatre to film ... but also casts a revealing light on social history, reflecting the enormous changes in English society, language and morals in the nearly 40 years since the play first appeared on the London stage."

The screenwriter, actors and director insisted that this Sleuth was not a "remake." Law called it "a completely reinvented Sleuth... It didn't feel like a remake. I always loved the idea at its heart of two men battling it out for a woman you never meet." Law further felt that he "was creating a character (Tindle), I wasn't recreating one." Caine said, "I never felt that I had gone back to Sleuth." He called the Pinter script "an entirely different thing. There isn't a single line in it that was in the other one, and Pinter had never seen the [1972] movie. Jude [Law] gave him the stage play and said, 'Write a screenplay for me' ... It was a completely different experience." In a television interview conducted on RAI TV during the Venice International Film Festival, Caine stated: "If the script hadn't been by Harold Pinter, I wouldn't have done the movie."

Pinter said, "It's a totally new take...I had not either seen or read the play, and I hadn't seen the film adapted from the play either, so I knew nothing about it. So I simply read the play and I think it's totally transformed. I've kept one or two plot things because you have to but apart from that, I think I've made it my own."

Caine stated, "The first Sleuth I thought was great and the second Sleuth I thought was great until I read the reviews. I said to Pinter, 'What film did they show them?' I have a feeling that [the new] Sleuth will be rediscovered some day."

Claustrophobia
Manohla Dargis of The New York Times wrote a review headlined "A Dance of Two Men, Twisting and Turning With a Gun That's More Than a Gun."  In contrast to Sarah Lyall's New York Times preview, Dargis wrote that she did not like watching the film, finding it too claustrophobic: "Mr. Branagh fiddles with the lights, tilts the camera and hustles his hard-working actors upstairs and down and back again and into an elevator as small as a coffin built for one. He embellishes the screenplay’s every obvious conceit and word, hammering the point until you feel as if you’re trapped inside the elevator with Milo and Andrew, going up and down and up and down, though nowhere in particular."

In his interview with Martin A. Grove, Branagh mentions that the danger of inducing claustrophobia in audience members is a risk that he took into account in filming Sleuth: "What Branagh didn't do that many Hollywood directors would have done is to open the film up by, for instance, having the two men drive to a nearby pub at some point in their conversation. 'Well, it's interesting you say that,' he told [Grove], 'There were discussions about that, but we said, 'If we believe in the power of the writing here and the power of the performances, but also, frankly, if we believe in the audience and believe that the audience can find this as fascinating as I do on the pages and if we can realize it to meet all of their expectations then the claustrophobia (won't be a problem).' "

The House
Director Branagh found shooting in the house difficult yet interesting. "The minimalism I found was a great challenge. The elevator was Harold's idea, so that was there and was a central feature of what we are going to bring to it. And then everything else was drawn from contemporary British architecture, contemporary British artists. The wire figure is by Anthony Gormley, one of our most famous sculptors. Gary Hume did all the artwork on the walls." Custom designed furniture from Ron Arad completes the look.

Release

Screenings
After premiering at the 64th Venice Film Festival on 30 August 2007, Sleuth was screened at the Toronto Film Festival on 10 September 2007. It was also screened at the Atlantic Film Festival, in Halifax, on 22 September 2007, the Aspen FilmFest on 26 September 2007, the Copenhagen International Film Festival, on 27 September 2007, the Calgary International Film Festival, in Alberta, on 28 September 2007 and the Haifa International Film Festival on 1 October 2007.

On 3 and 4 October 2007, Sleuth was screened at Variety's 2007 Screening Series in New York, at the Chelsea West Cinemas, and in Los Angeles, at the ArcLight Theatre. Kenneth Branagh, Michael Caine and Jude Law made interviews on the television programs The Today Show, RAI TV, Late Show with David Letterman, The Charlie Rose Show, and Reel Talk with Jeffrey Lyons.

Reception 
On Rotten Tomatoes, the film has an approval rating of 36% based on 122 reviews with an average rating of 5.13/10. The critical consensus states that "Sleuth is so obvious and coarse, rather than suspenseful and action-packed, that it does nothing to improve on the original version." On Metacritic the film has a score of 49% based on reviews from 30 critics, indicating "mixed or average reviews".

Time film reviewer Richard Corliss indicated he was not pleased with the outcome, concluding, "if you consider what the exalted quartet of Branagh, Pinter, Caine and Law might have done with the project, and what they did to it, Sleuth has to be the worst prestige movie of the year."

Claudia Puig of USA Today was more appreciative, writing, "Caine and Law are in fine form bantering cleverly in this entertaining cat-and-mouse game, thanks to the inspired dialogue of Harold Pinter. They parry, using witticisms instead of swords. Then they do a dance of deception, a veritable tango. There's thievery, peril and plenty of double-crossing. (...) As directed by Kenneth Branagh, this new version is darker and more claustrophobic. In the original the house where all the action took place was Gothic and laden with gewgaws. The new domicile is stark and minimalist, and much more threatening. Branagh's version has more incipient horror and less camp."

Roger Ebert of the Chicago Sun-Times wrote, "It's no mystery that 'Sleuth' is fascinating," observing that Pinter "has written a new country house mystery, which is not really a mystery at all in terms of its plot, and eerily impenetrable in its human relationship" and that "in 'Sleuth' what [Kenneth Branagh] celebrates is perplexing, ominous, insinuating material in the hands of two skilled actors." J.R. Jones of The Chicago Reader wrote, "Director Kenneth Branagh has mercifully pared the action down to 88 minutes (the first movie dragged on for 138), but the final act, with its obscure homosexual flirtation, still seems to go on forever."

Carina Chocano, writing in the Los Angeles Times, stated: "The verbal sparring is so sharp [that] it's a wonder nobody loses an eye. [...] and it's an unmitigated pleasure to observe Caine and Law attack it with such ferocity. Sleuth is nasty fun." Terry Lawson of the Detroit Free Press, criticised the performances by the lead actors, saying, "We're left with two suitably hammy performances by Caine and Law, who do not forget they are actors playing actors"

Leonard Maltin, who rated the original film 4 out of 4 stars, gave this version a "BOMB" rating (0 out of 4), the lowest rating he has ever given a Branagh film, stating that the new version "has every ounce of entertainment drained from it" and called the film "unbelievably bad".

Soundtrack

Patrick Doyle is the composer and the music is performed by the London Symphony Orchestra. The soundtrack is produced by Varèse Sarabande and was released in October 2007.

 Track listing
 The Visitor – 2:06
 The Ladder – 2:49
 You're Now You – 1:26
 I'm Not A Hairdresser – 3:28
 Black Arrival – 2:22
 Milo Tindle – 2:17
 I Was Lying – 2:30
 Itch Twitch – 2:23
 Rat in a Trap – 2:26
 One Set All – 2:24
 Cobblers – 1:39
 Sleuth – 6:05
 Too Much Sleuth (Dance Mixes by Patrick Doyle Jr.) – 3:51

See also
 List of American films of 2007

Notes

 Corliss, Richard. "Murder Mystery: Who Killed Sleuth?" Time, 12 October 2007. Retrieved 11 November 2007.
 Dargis, Manohla. "A Dance of Two Men, Twisting and Turning With a Gun That's More Than a Gun".  The New York Times, 12 October 2007. Retrieved 12 October 2007.
 Grove, Martin A. " 'Sleuth' Reimagination Shows Imagination".  The Hollywood Reporter, 17 October 2007. Retrieved 17 October 2007. (Interview with Kenneth Branagh.)
 Interview with Jude Law. ABC News. 26 October 2007. Retrieved 12 November 2007.
 Interview with Jude Law. "Act Three" of Show #2823.  Late Show with David Letterman. CBS. 2 October 2007. Official website. Retrieved 27 October 2007. (Synopsis.) (Video clips of selected parts of program on site; clip from this segment not posted there.)
 Interview with Jude Law. RAI TV TV/TG1. Posted on RAInet. Retrieved 14 September 2007.
 Interview with Jude Law and Michael Caine. "Video: Celebrity Interviews: British Invasion: Law and Caine".  Today. NBC. 3 October 2007. Retrieved 9 November 2007.
 Interview with Michael Caine. RAI TV/TG1. Posted on RAInet. Retrieved 14 September 2007.
 Lowerison, Jean. "Sleuth: Still Diabolically Clever".  San Diego Metropolitan. Retrieved 20 November 2007.
 Interview with Jude Law. ABC News. 26 October 2007. Retrieved 12 November 2007.
 Jeffrey Lyons, "(U)ncovering a 'Sleuth': Jeffrey Lyons Exposes the Many Layers of Jude Law". Reel Talk, NBC, broadcast 3 November 2007. Retrieved 4 November 2007. (Video clip of interview.) [Correction of typographical error in online version of title.]
 Rose, Charlie. "A Conversation with Actor Jude Law".  The Charlie Rose Show, WNET (New York), broadcast 19 –20 October 2007, 11:30 p.m. ET–12:26 p.m. ET. Streaming video posted 22 October 2007. Retrieved 27 October 2007.
 Sleuth at the 2007 Toronto International Film Festival. Official website. Retrieved 14 September 2007.
 "Sleuth Cracks It in Venice". RealPlayer video clip of interview with director Kenneth Branagh and actor Jude Law conducted during the Venice Film Festival. BBC News, 1 September 2007. Retrieved 14 September 2007.
 "Sleuth Interview: Branagh, Law and Caine". Director Kenneth Branagh and actors Jude Law and Michael Caine discuss the remake of Anthony Shaffer's 1972 screenplay, Sleuth. Venice Film Festival.  Telegraph TV Video, video clip, The Daily Telegraph, August 2007. Retrieved 2 December 2007.
 "Sleuth Premieres in Venice". Feature including panel discussion with Branagh, Law, and Michael Caine, Venice Film Festival.  UK MSN video clip (ITN), 31 August 2007. Retrieved 14 September 2007.

References

External links
 Sleuth at Paramount Pictures in the UK –  Official (companion) film site hosting video excerpts of the making of Sleuth (behind the scenes), with commentary by director Kenneth Branagh. Retrieved 8 March 2008.
 Sleuth at Sony Pictures Classics – Official film site (US). Retrieved 8 March 2008. Features links to synopsis, trailer, gallery of production photos, biographies for cast (Caine and Law) and crew (Pinter and Branagh), some excerpts from reviews, and showtimes
 Sleuth Japanese official site. Retrieved 16 March 2008.
 
 
 

2007 films
2000s mystery films
2007 psychological thriller films
2000s English-language films
American mystery films
British thriller films
Films about con artists
Films about writers
British films based on plays
American films based on plays
Films directed by Kenneth Branagh
Castle Rock Entertainment films
Sony Pictures Classics films
Films with screenplays by Harold Pinter
Films scored by Patrick Doyle
Films set in country houses
Paramount Pictures films
2000s American films
2000s British films